() is a Japanese multinational conglomerate corporation headquartered in Chiyoda, Tokyo, Japan. It is the parent company of the Hitachi Group (Hitachi Gurūpu) and had formed part of the Nissan zaibatsu and later DKB Group and Fuyo Group of companies before DKB and Fuji Bank (the core Fuyo Group company) merged into the Mizuho Financial Group. As of 2020, Hitachi conducts business ranging from IT, including AI, the Internet of Things, and big data, to infrastructure.

Hitachi is listed on the Tokyo Stock Exchange and Nagoya Stock Exchange and its Tokyo listing is a constituent of the Nikkei 225 and TOPIX Core30 indices. It is ranked 38th in the 2012 Fortune Global 500 and 129th in the 2012 Forbes Global 2000.

History 

Hitachi was founded in 1910 by electrical engineer Namihei Odaira (1874–1951) in Ibaraki Prefecture. The company's first product was Japan's first  induction motor, initially developed for use in copper mining.

The company began as an in-house venture of Fusanosuke Kuhara's mining company in Hitachi, Ibaraki. Odaira moved headquarters to Tokyo in 1918. Odaira coined the company's toponymic name by superimposing two kanji characters: hi meaning "sun" and tachi meaning "rise".

World War II had a significant impact on the company with many of its factories being destroyed by Allied bombing raids, and discord after the war. Founder Odaira was removed from the company and Hitachi Zosen Corporation was spun out. Hitachi's reconstruction efforts after the war were hindered by a labor strike in 1950. Meanwhile, Hitachi went public in 1949.

Hitachi America, Ltd. was established in 1959.

The Soviet Union started to produce air conditioners in 1975. The Baku factory was established under the license of the Japanese company, Hitachi. Volumes of production of air conditioners in the USSR were small, about 500,000 per year. However air conditioners were a matter of great pride. Mainly window air conditioners were produced. Most of the output was exported. 

Hitachi Europe, Ltd. was established in 1982.

At the CES 2007, Hitachi revealed the first consumer HDD with a storage of 1 TB, which was released in the same year.

From 2006 to 2010, Hitachi lost US$12.5 billion, the largest corporate loss in Japanese history. This prompted Hitachi to restructure and sell a number of divisions and businesses, a process that is expected to end in 2021.

In March 2011, Hitachi agreed to sell its hard disk drive subsidiary, HGST, to Western Digital for a combination of cash and shares worth US$4.3 billion. Due to concerns of a duopoly of WD and Seagate Technology by the EU Commission and the Federal Trade Commission, Hitachi's 3.5" HDD division was sold to Toshiba. The transaction was completed in March 2012.

In January 2012, Hitachi announced it would stop producing televisions in Japan. In September 2012, Hitachi announced that it had invented a long-term data solution out of quartz glass that was capable of preserving information for millions of years. In October 2012, Hitachi agreed to acquire the United Kingdom-based nuclear energy company Horizon Nuclear Power, which plans to construct up to six nuclear power plants in the UK, from E.ON and RWE for £700 million. In November 2012, Hitachi and Mitsubishi Heavy Industries agreed to merge their thermal power generation businesses into a joint venture to be owned 65% by Mitsubishi Heavy Industries and 35% by Hitachi. The joint venture named Mitsubishi Hitachi Power Systems (MHPS) began operations in February 2014.

On 28 September 2015, the Securities and Exchange Commission charged Hitachi with violations of the Foreign Corrupt Practices Act. The SEC alleged that Hitachi had made "improper payments" to the African National Congress in South Africa related to the supply of equipment for power plants. 

In October 2015, Hitachi completed a deal with Johnson Controls to form a joint venture that would take over Hitachi's HVAC business. Hitachi maintained a 40% stake in the resulting company, Johnson Controls-Hitachi Air Conditioning. In May 2016, Hitachi announced it was investing $2.8 billion into its IoT interests.

Following the Fukushima Daiichi nuclear disaster in 2011 and the extended temporary closure of most Japanese nuclear plants, Hitachi's nuclear business became unprofitable and in 2016 Hitachi CEO Toshiaki Higashihara argued Japan should consider a merger of the various competing nuclear businesses. Hitachi is taking for 2016 an estimated ¥65 billion write-off in value of a SILEX technology laser uranium enrichment joint venture with General Electric.

In February 2017, Hitachi and Honda announced a partnership to develop, produce and sell motors for electric vehicles. Also in 2017, private equity firm KKR bought Hitachi Kokusai's (itself a subsidiary of Hitachi) semiconductor equipment division, becoming Kokusai Electric. In 2019, Applied Materials announced that it would acquire Kokusai Electric from KKR for US$2.2 billion. The deal was later terminated in 2021.

In 2018, Hitachi stopped selling televisions in Japan because its market share had dropped to 1%, opting to sell Sony TVs through its existing dealer network.

On March 14, 2018, Zoomdata announced its partnership with Hitachi INS Software to help develop big data analytics market in Japan.

In December 2018, Hitachi Ltd. announced it would take over 80% of ABB Ltd.'s power grid division for $6.4 billion renaming it Hitachi-ABB Power Grids in the process.  In October2021, the enterprise was rebranded HitachiEnergy.

From 2008 to 2018, Hitachi reduced the number of its listed group companies and consolidated subsidiaries in Japan from 22 to 4 and around 400 to 202, respectively, through restructuring and sell-offs. It plans to become a company specializing in IT and infrastructure maintenance in the near future.

In 2019, Hitachi sold its medical imaging business to Fujifilm for US$1.7 billion. Showa Denko bought Hitachi Chemical from Hitachi and other shareholders, at US$42.97 per share. Until then, Hitachi Chemical had been considered to be a core unit of the group. Hitachi also suspended the ABWR development by its British subsidiary Horizon Nuclear Power as it did not provide adequate "economic rationality as a private enterprise" to proceed.

In October 2019, the talks between Honda and Hitachi to consolidate their four automotive parts businesses, Showa, Nissin and Keihin of the former and the latter's Hitachi Automotive Systems, have reportedly begun, resulting in the creation of a "mega supplier" named Hitachi Astemo incorporated in January 2021.

In September 2020, Hitachi abandoned plans to create nuclear power plants in Gloucestershire and Wales due to issues with funding due to the impact of COVID-19. In the same month, Hitachi Capital agreed to be bought by its second-largest shareholder, business partner, and former rival Mitsubishi UFJ Lease, which invested in the Hitachi subsidiary in 2016.

In November 2020, it announced that Hitachi Metals and Hitachi Construction Machinery, both being some of the last remaining listed subsidiaries, will likely be detached from the group according to the restructuring plan. In December, Hitachi sold a 60% stake in its overseas home appliance business to Turkish Arcelik for US$300 million.

In December 2021, it was announced by OPG that they had selected GE-Hitachi to construct two BWRX-300 reactors at the Darlington site in Ontario, Canada. OPG and GE-Hitachi will be collaborating on the design, planning and preparation of license materials for the construction of Canada's first SMR which is planned to enter operation in 2028.

Products and services

Automotive systems 

 Car Information Systems
 Drive Control
 Electric Powertrain Systems
 Engine Management Systems

Construction machinery 

 Hydraulic Excavators
 Forestry Equipment
 Mechanical & Hydraulic Cranes
 Mining Dump Trucks
 Crawler Dump trucks
 Wheel Loaders

Defense systems 
 Military vehicles
 Vetronics
 Crisis management
 C4I systems
 Satellite image processing systems
 Social Infrastructure security business (in coordination with Hitachi's Infrastructure Systems Group)
 Electric propulsion technology
 Electro-mechanical systems (including some robotics research & development)
 Advanced Combat Infantry Equipment System [ACIES] (JSDF) - Primary contractor

Digital media and consumer products 

 Air conditioning equipment - jointly with Johnson Controls
 Hitachi Magic Wand
Optical disc drives - jointly with optical disc drive division of LG as Hitachi-LG Data Storage
 White goods (refrigerators, washing machines, etc.) - majority stake of ex-Japan business sold to Arcelik.

Electronic systems and equipment 
 Test and measurement equipment
 Particle therapy equipment
 Cell culture equipment

Advanced materials
 Specialty steels
 Wires and cables

Information and telecommunication systems 

ATMs
 Servers
 Disk array subsystems
Data storage and analytics solutions
 Virtual Storage Platform
 Internet of Things
 Hitachi Lumada
 VOS3 Mainframe computer operating system
 Software
Outsourcing services
Telecommunications equipment

Power systems 
 Nuclear and hydrogen power generation systems
Power Grids
GE Hitachi Nuclear Energy

Social infrastructure and industrial systems 

 Elevators
 Escalators
 Industrial machinery and plants
 Railway vehicles and systems
 Hitachi A-train

Others 
 Logistics
 Property management

Subsidiaries

Hitachi Vantara 

Hitachi Vantara is a wholly owned subsidiary of Hitachi which provides hardware, software and services to help companies manage their digital data. Its flagship products are the Virtual Storage Platform (for enterprise storage), Hitachi Unified Storage VM for large-sized companies, Hitachi Unified Storage for small and mid-sized companies, Hitachi Content Platform (archiving and cloud architecture), Hitachi Command Suite (for storage management), Hitachi TrueCopy and Hitachi Universal Replicator (for remote replication), and the Hitachi NAS Platform.

Since September 19, 2017, Hitachi Data Systems (HDS) has become part of Hitachi Vantara, a new company that unifies the operations of Pentaho, Hitachi Data Systems and Hitachi Insight Group. The company name "Hitachi Data Systems" (HDS) and its logo is no longer used in the market. Hitachi Consulting, the group's international management and technology consulting subsidiary with headquarters in Dallas, Texas, was integrated with Hitachi Vantara in 2019.

Hitachi Metals 
Among other things, Hitachi Metals supplies materials for aircraft engines and fuselage components (e.g. landing gear), along with finished components for same and other aerospace applications. It also provides materials, components and tools for the automotive and electronics industries. Among the Hitachi Metals facilities is Hitachi Metal Yasugi Works or Tatara Works, one of the oldest furnaces in Japan, famously featured as a main backdrop in Princess Mononoke, a Japanese animation film set in the Muromachi period.

As of September 2020, Hitachi Metals is set to be divested as part of the long-term restructuring plan being executed by the group.

Hitachi Rail 

Hitachi is a major rolling stock manufacturer.

Hitachi acquired Italian rolling stock manufacturer AnsaldoBreda in 2015, renaming it Hitachi Rail Italy

Hitachi Astemo 
Hitachi Astemo, which stands for "Advanced Sustainable Technologies for Mobility", is a 67-33 joint venture between Hitachi and Honda, which merged their four auto parts affiliates and division, the latter's three keiretsu companies Showa Corporation, Keihin Corporation, and Nissin Kogyo, and the former's wholly owned Hitachi Automotive Systems, to be better equipped for the changing car market environment, frequently represented as CASE, for which they will integrate their assets to accelerate development of new technology and software.

Hitachi Astemo is considered a "mega supplier", as annual sales of the four predecessors combined stood at $17 billion, placing it as the second largest among the compatriot auto suppliers.

Other subsidiaries 

The rest of the group companies include:
Hitachi Building Systems Co., Ltd.
Hitachi High-tech
Hitachi Construction Machinery
Hitachi Construction Machinery (Europe)
GE Hitachi Nuclear Energy (co-owned by General Electric)
Hitachi Global Life Solutions - Selling home appliances except audiovisual products.
Johnson Controls-Hitachi Air Conditioning - A/C business majority-owned by Johnson Controls since 2015.
Hitachi Digital Media Group - Selling electronic products including video projectors under its brand name.
Hitachi Plant Technologies - Engaging in the design, development, manufacture, sale, servicing, and execution of social and industrial infrastructure machinery, mechatronics, air-conditioning systems, industrial plants, and energy plant equipment in Asia and internationally.
Hitachi Communication Technologies America - Providing communications products and services for the telecommunications, cable TV, utility, enterprise, industrial and other markets.
Hitachi Solutions America - A consulting firm and systems integrator focusing primarily on Microsoft Dynamics. Hitachi Solutions America acquired Ignify, a Microsoft Dynamics Solution provider, in December 2015.
Hitachi Industrial Equipment Systems - producing industrial automation systems and equipment.
Hitachi Transport System - providing one-stop logistics services.
Hitachi Energy

Discontinued or divested businesses

Hitachi Capital 

Leasing
 Loan guarantees
 Invoice finance
 Consumer finance (personal and retail)
 Business finance

Bought by Mitsubishi, it had been the group's financial business arm.

Hitachi Works 
Spin-off entities from Hitachi Works include Hitachi Cable (1956) and Hitachi Canadian Industries Limited (founded 1988 in Saskatoon and closed in 2016 as Mitsubishi-Hitachi Power Systems).

As Hitachi pulled out of MHPS and handed over the control to MHI, Hitachi Works was also transferred, becoming part of Mitsubishi Power.

Others 
Other former businesses Hitachi had had include the following:
Aircraft
 Hitachi T.2
Hitachi TR.2
 Aircraft Engines
 Hitachi Hatsukaze
Hitachi Zosen
 Ships - Business merged with the shipbuilding operation of NKK corporation to form Universal Shipbuilding Corporation
 Displays
Plasma and LCD Televisions - Ceased production. Brand name continues to be licensed to Vestel for TVs sold at Argos in the UK.
 Small LCDs - Divested to be part of Japan Display
 Projectors - Sold to Maxell
 Memory chips - Spun off to be part of Elpida Memory
System LSIs - Spun off to be part of Renesas Technology
 Personal computers - Ceased production
 Mobile phones - Merged with Casio's cellphone manufacturing business, then absorbed into NEC Mobile Communications
 Batteries - Sold to Maxell
 Drilling instruments (Hitachi Via Mechanics) - Sold to The Longreach Group
 Hard disk drives - Separated division for this product line as Hitachi Global Storage Technologies, then HGST was purchased by Western Digital
 Mainframe computer hardware - Stopped exporting in 2000; Ceased production in 2017 to focus on the operating system business.
Hitachi Kokusai Electric - Sold to KKR
Telecommunication equipment
 Chemical vapor deposition equipment
Power tools (Hitachi Koki) - Sold to KKR and renamed Hikoki
 Car navigation system (Clarion) - Sold to Faurecia
 Wind turbines - Ceased production
 Chemical products (Hitachi Chemical) - Sold to Showa Denko and renamed Showa Denko Materials
 Medical diagnostic equipment - Sold to Fujifilm
 Thermal power generation system (Mitsubishi Hitachi Power Systems) - Shares held by Hitachi transferred to Mitsubishi

Philanthropy 
In August 2011, it was announced that Hitachi would donate an electron microscope to each of five universities in Indonesia (the University of North Sumatra in Medan, the Indonesian Christian University in Jakarta, Padjadjaran University in Bandung, General Soedirman University in Purwokerto and Muhammadiyah University in Malang).

See also 
 ATM Industry Association (ATMIA)

Notes

References

External links 

 

 
Japanese companies established in 1910
Aircraft engine manufacturers of Japan
Audio equipment manufacturers of Japan
1940s initial public offerings
Companies listed on the Tokyo Stock Exchange
Companies listed on the Nagoya Stock Exchange
Companies formerly listed on the New York Stock Exchange
Computer security companies
Conglomerate companies of Japan
Consumer electronics brands
Defense companies of Japan
Display technology companies
Electrical engineering companies of Japan
Electrical wiring and construction supplies manufacturers
Electronics companies of Japan
Elevator manufacturers
Equipment semiconductor companies
Escalator manufacturers
Fuyo Group
Home appliance manufacturers of Japan
Heating, ventilation, and air conditioning companies
Industrial machine manufacturers
Japanese brands
Robotics in Japan
Midori-kai
Military vehicle manufacturers
Mobile phone manufacturers
Multinational companies headquartered in Japan
Nuclear technology companies of Japan
Power tool manufacturers
Public safety communications
Rail infrastructure manufacturers
Robotics companies of Japan
Rolling stock manufacturers of Japan
Conglomerate companies established in 1910
Wind turbine manufacturers
Steam turbine manufacturers
Mining equipment companies
Manufacturing companies established in 1910
Electronics companies established in 1910
Carburetor manufacturers
Electric motor manufacturers
Engine manufacturers of Japan
Pump manufacturers
Tool manufacturing companies of Japan